Anthoupoli is the northern terminal station of  Athens Metro Line 2 since the Peristeri extension in April 2013.

References

Athens Metro stations
Railway stations opened in 2013
2013 establishments in Greece